Twilley may refer to:

Dwight Twilley (born 1951), American pop/rock singer and songwriter
Twilley (Dwight Twilley album), 1979
Howard Twilley, (born 1943), former professional American football wide receiver
5500 Twilley (1981 WR), a main belt asteroid